Adobe Creative Suite (CS) is a discontinued software suite of graphic design, video editing, and web development applications developed by Adobe Systems.

The last of the Creative Suite versions, Adobe Creative Suite 6 (CS6), was launched at a release event on April 23, 2012, and released on May 7, 2012. CS6 was the last of the Adobe design tools to be physically shipped as boxed software as future releases and updates would be delivered via download only.

On May 6, 2013, Adobe announced that CS6 would be the last version of the Creative Suite, and that future versions of their creative software would only be available via their Adobe Creative Cloud subscription model. Adobe also announced that it would continue to support CS6 and would provide bug fixes and security updates through the next major upgrades of both Mac and Windows operating systems (as of 2013). The Creative Suite packages were pulled from Adobe's online store in 2013, but were still available on their website until January 2017.

Applications 

The following table shows the different details of the core applications in the various Adobe Creative Suite editions. Each edition may come with all these apps included or only a subset.

Editions 
Adobe sold Creative Suite applications in several different combinations called "editions", these included:
 Adobe Creative Suite 6 Design Standard is an edition of the Adobe Creative Suite 6 family of products intended for professional print, web, interactive and mobile designers.
 Adobe Creative Suite 6 Design & Web Premium is an edition of the Adobe Creative Suite 6 family of products intended for professional web designers and developers.
 Adobe Creative Suite 6 Production Premium is an edition of the Adobe Creative Suite 6 family of products intended for professional rich media and video post-production experts who create projects for film, video, broadcast, web, DVD, Blu-ray Disc, and mobile devices.
 Adobe Creative Suite 6 Master Collection contains applications from all of the above editions.

Adobe Flash Catalyst, Adobe Contribute, Adobe OnLocation, and Adobe Device Central, previously available in CS5.5, have been dropped from the CS6 line-up. Adobe Prelude and Adobe Encore are not released as standalone products. Adobe Encore is available as part of Adobe Premiere Pro. Adobe InCopy, a word processing application that integrates with Adobe InDesign, is also part of the Creative Suite family, but is not included in any CS6 edition.

In March 2013, it was reported that Adobe would no longer sell boxed copies of the Creative Suite software, instead offering digital downloads and monthly subscriptions.

History

Creative Suite 1 and 2 

The first version of Adobe Creative Suite was released in September 2003 and Creative Suite 2 in April 2005. The first two versions (CS and CS2) were available in two editions.

The Standard Edition included:
 Adobe Bridge (since CS2)
 Adobe Illustrator
Adobe InCopy
 Adobe InDesign
 Adobe Photoshop
Adobe Premiere Pro (since CS2)
 Adobe ImageReady
 Adobe Version Cue
 Design guide and training resources
 Adobe Stock Photos

The Premium Edition also included:
 Adobe Acrobat Professional (Version 8 in CS2.3)
 Adobe Dreamweaver (since CS2.3)
 Adobe GoLive

Creative Suite helped InDesign become the dominant publishing software, replacing QuarkXPress, because customers who purchased the suite for Photoshop and Illustrator received InDesign at no additional cost.

Adobe shut down the "activation" servers for CS2 in December 2012, making it impossible for licensed users to reinstall the software if needed. In response to complaints, Adobe then made available for download a version of CS2 that did not require online activation, and published a serial number to activate it offline. Because there was no mechanism to prevent people who had never purchased a CS2 license from downloading and activating it, it was widely thought that the aging software had become either freeware or abandonware, despite Adobe's later explanation that it was intended only for people who had "legitimately purchased CS2". The later shutdown of the CS3 and CS4 activation servers was handled differently, with registered users given the opportunity to get individual serial numbers for offline activation, rather than a published one.

Creative Suite Production Studio 
Adobe Creative Suite Production Studio (previously Adobe Video Collection) was a suite of programs for acquiring, editing, and distributing digital video and audio that was released during the same timeframe as Adobe Creative Suite 2.  The suite was available in standard and premium editions.

The Adobe Production Studio Premium edition consisted of:
 Adobe After Effects Professional
 Adobe Audition
 Adobe Bridge
 Adobe Encore DVD
 Adobe Premiere Pro
 Adobe Photoshop
 Adobe Illustrator
 Adobe Dynamic Link (Not sold separately)

The Standard edition consisted of:
 Adobe After Effects Standard
 Adobe Bridge
 Adobe Premiere Pro
 Adobe Photoshop

Since CS3, Adobe Production Studio became part of the Creative Suite family.  The equivalent version for Production Studio Premium is the Adobe Creative Suite Production Premium.

Macromedia Studio 
Macromedia Studio was a suite of programs designed for web content creation designed and distributed by Macromedia. After Adobe's 2005 acquisition of Macromedia, Macromedia Studio 8 was replaced, modified, and integrated into two editions of the Adobe Creative Suite family of software from version 2.3 onwards. The closest relatives of Macromedia Studio 8 are now called Adobe Creative Suite Web Premium.

Core applications from Macromedia Studio have been merged with Adobe Creative Suite since CS3, including Flash, Dreamweaver, and Fireworks. Some Macromedia applications were absorbed into existing Adobe products, e.g. FreeHand has been replaced with Adobe Illustrator. Director and ColdFusion are not part of Adobe Creative Suite and will only be available as standalone products. The final version of Macromedia Studio released include:
 Macromedia Studio MX Released May 29, 2002, internally it was version 6 and the first incarnation of the studio to use the "MX" suffix, which for marketing purposes was a shorthand abbreviation that meant "Maximize". Studio MX included Dreamweaver, Flash, FreeHand, Fireworks and a developer edition of ColdFusion.
 Macromedia Studio MX Plus Released February 10, 2003, sometimes referred to as MX 1.1. MX Plus was a special edition release of MX that included Freehand MX (replacing Freehand 10), Contribute and DevNet Resource Kit Special Edition in addition to the existing MX suite of products.
 Macromedia Studio MX 2004 Released September 10, 2003, despite its name, it is internally version 7. Studio MX 2004 included FreeHand along with updated versions of Dreamweaver, Flash and Fireworks. An alternate version of Studio MX 2004 included Flash Professional and a new interface for Dreamweaver.
 Macromedia Studio 8 Released September 13, 2005, Studio 8 was the last version of Macromedia Studio. It comprised Dreamweaver 8, Flash 8, Flash 8 Video Converter, Fireworks 8, Contribute 3 and FlashPaper.

Creative Suite 3 

Adobe Creative Suite 3 (CS3) was announced on March 27, 2007; it introduced universal binaries for all major programs for the Apple Macintosh, as well as including all of the core applications from Macromedia Studio and Production Studio.

Some Creative Suite programs also began using the Presto layout engine used in the Opera web browser.

Adobe began selling CS3 applications in six different combinations called "editions." Design Standard & Premium and Web Standard & Premium began shipping on April 16, 2007, and Production Premium and Master Collection editions began shipping on July 2, 2007.  The latest released CS3 version was version 3.3, released on June 2, 2008. In this version Fireworks CS3 was included in Design Premium and all editions that had included Acrobat 8 Pro had it replaced with Acrobat 9 Pro. Below is a matrix of the applications included in each edition of CS3 version 3.3:

CS3 included several programs, including Dreamweaver, Flash Professional, and Fireworks that were developed by Macromedia, a former rival acquired by Adobe in 2005. It also included Adobe OnLocation and Adobe Ultra that were developed by Serious Magic, also a firm acquired by Adobe in 2006.

Adobe dropped the following programs (that were previously included in CS2) from the CS3 software bundles:
 Adobe GoLive (replaced by Adobe Dreamweaver)
 Adobe ImageReady (merged into Adobe Photoshop and replaced by Adobe Fireworks)
Adobe Audition (replaced by Adobe Soundbooth)

Adobe had announced that it would continue to develop Audition as a standalone product, while GoLive had been discontinued. Adobe GoLive 9 was released as a standalone product on June 10, 2007.  Adobe Audition 3 was announced as a standalone product on September 6, 2007.  Adobe had discontinued ImageReady and had replaced it with Fireworks, with some of ImageReady's features integrated into Photoshop. Audition became part of the Creative Suite again in CS5.5 when Soundbooth was discontinued.

Creative Suite 4 

Adobe Creative Suite 4 (CS4) was announced on September 23, 2008, and officially released on October 15, 2008. All applications in CS4 featured the same user interface, with a new tabbed interface for working with concurrently running Adobe CS4 programs where multiple documents can be opened inside multiple tabs contained in a single window.

Adobe CS4 was also developed to perform better under 64-bit and multi-core processors.  On MS Windows, Adobe Photoshop CS4 ran natively as a 64-bit application.  Although they were not natively 64-bit applications, Adobe After Effects CS4 and Adobe Premiere Pro CS4 had been optimized for 64-bit computers. However, there were no 64-bit versions of CS4 available for Mac OS X. Additionally, CS4 was the last version of Adobe Creative Suite installable on the PowerPC architecture on Mac OS X, although not all applications in the suite are available for PowerPC. The unavailable products on PowerPC include the featured applications within the Production Premium collection (Soundbooth, Encore, After Effects, Premiere, and OnLocation). In early testing of 64-bit support in Adobe Photoshop CS4, overall performance gains ranged from 8% to 12%, due to the fact that 64-bit applications could address larger amounts of memory and thus resulted in less file swapping — one of the biggest factors that can affect data processing speed.

Two programs were dropped from the CS4 line-up: Adobe Ultra, a vector keying application which utilizes image analysis technology to produce high quality chroma key effects in less than ideal lighting environments and provides keying of a subject into a virtual 3D environment through virtual set technology, and Adobe Stock Photos. Below is a matrix of the applications that were bundled in each of the software suites for CS4:

Creative Suite 5 

Adobe Creative Suite 5 (CS5) was released on April 30, 2010. From CS5 onwards, Windows versions of Adobe Premiere Pro CS5 and Adobe After Effects CS5 were 64-bit only and required at least Windows Vista 64-bit or a later 64-bit Windows version. Windows XP Professional x64 Edition was no longer supported. The Mac versions of the CS5 programs were rewritten using macOS's Cocoa APIs in an effort to modernize the codebase. These new Mac versions dropped support for PowerPC-based Macs and were 64-bit Intel-only. Adobe Version Cue, an application that enabled users to track and manipulate file metadata and automate the process of collaboratively reviewing documents among groups of people, and the Adobe Creative Suite Web Standard edition, previously available in CS4, were dropped from the CS5 line-up. Below is a matrix of the applications that were bundled in each of the software suites for CS5:

Creative Suite 5.5 
Following the release of CS5 in April 2010, Adobe changed its release strategy to an every other year release of major number installments. CS5.5 was presented on April 12, 2011, as an in-between program until CS6. The update helped developers optimize websites for a variety of tablets, smart phones, and other devices. At the same time, Adobe announced a subscription-based pay service as an alternative to full purchase. On July 1, 2011, Adobe Systems announced its Switcher Program, which will allow people who had purchased any version of Apple's Final Cut Pro (or Avid Media Composer) to receive a 50 percent discount on Creative Suite CS5.5 Production Premium or Premiere Pro CS5.5.

Not all products were upgraded to CS5.5 in this release; applications that were upgraded to CS5.5 included Adobe InDesign, Adobe Flash Catalyst, Adobe Flash Professional, Adobe Dreamweaver, Adobe Premiere Pro, Adobe After Effects, and Adobe Device Central. Adobe Audition also replaced Adobe Soundbooth in CS5.5, Adobe Story was first offered as an AIR-powered screenwriting and preproduction application, and Adobe Acrobat X Pro replaced Acrobat 9.3 Pro. Below is a matrix of the applications that were bundled in each of the software suites for CS5.5:

Creative Suite 6 
During an Adobe conference call on June 21, 2011, CEO Shantanu Narayen said that the April 2011 launch of CS5.5 was "the first release in our transition to an annual release cycle",  adding, "We intend to ship the next milestone release of Creative Suite in 2012."  On March 21, 2012, Adobe released a freely available beta version of Adobe Photoshop CS6. The final version of Adobe CS6 was launched on a release event April 23, 2012, and first shipped May 7. Adobe also launched a subscription-based offering named Adobe Creative Cloud where users are able to gain access to individual applications or the full Adobe Creative Suite 6 suite on a per-month basis, plus additional cloud storage spaces and services.

The native 64-bit Windows applications available in Creative Suite 6 were Photoshop, Illustrator, After Effects (64-bit only), Premiere Pro (64-bit only), Encore (64-bit only), SpeedGrade (64-bit only) and Bridge.

Discontinuation

On May 5, 2013, during the opening keynote of its Adobe MAX conference, Adobe announced that it was retiring the "Creative Suite" branding in favor of "Creative Cloud", and making all future feature updates to its software (now appended with "CC" instead of "CS", e.g. Photoshop CC) available via the Creative Cloud subscription service rather than through the purchasing of perpetual licenses.

Customers must pay a subscription fee and if they stop paying, they will lose access to the proprietary file formats, which are not backward-compatible with the Creative Suite (Adobe admitted that this is a valid concern). Individual subscribers must have an Internet connection to download the software and to use the 2 GB of provided storage space (or the additionally purchased 20 GB), and must validate the license monthly.

Adobe's decision to make the subscription service the only sales route for its creative software was met with strong criticism (see Creative Cloud controversy). Several online articles began offering replacements of Photoshop, Illustrator, and other programs, with free software such as GIMP and Inkscape or competing products such as Affinity Designer, CorelDRAW, PaintShop Pro, and Pixelmator directly offering alternatives.

In addition to many of the products formerly part of the Creative Suite (one product, Fireworks, was announced as having reached the end of its development cycle), Creative Cloud also offers subscription-exclusive products such as Adobe Muse and the Adobe Edge family, Web-based file and website hosting, Typekit fonts, and access to the Behance social media platform. The new CC versions of their applications, and the full launch of the updated Creative Cloud service, was announced for June 17, 2013. New versions with major feature updates have been released regularly, with a refresh of the file formats occurring in October 2014. Adobe also announced that it would continue to offer bug fixes for the CS6 products so that they will continue to run on the next versions of Microsoft Windows and Apple OS X. However, they have said there are no updates planned to enable CS6 to run in macOS Catalina.

References

External links 
 Adobe Creative Suite

 
Desktop publishing software
MacOS graphics software
MacOS multimedia software
Media readers
Photo software
Raster graphics editors
Technical communication tools
Typesetting software
Vector graphics editors
Windows graphics-related software
Windows multimedia software
2003 software